Nomada verecunda is a species in the family Apidae ("cuckoo, carpenter, digger, bumble, and honey bees"), in the order Hymenoptera ("ants, bees, wasps and sawflies").
Nomada verecunda is found in North America.

References

Further reading
 

Nomadinae
Insects described in 1879